Johan Ivarsson (born 16 March 1967) is a Swedish orienteering competitor. He won the overall world cup in 1996.

World championships
He participated at the 1995 World Orienteering Championships in Detmold, where he received a bronze medal in the relay event with the Swedish team. He received a bronze medal as part of the Swedish team in the relay also at the 1999 World Championships in Inverness.

World cup
Ivarsson finished first overall in the 1996 Orienteering World Cup, and second in 1998, behind Chris Terkelsen.

References

External links

1967 births
Living people
Swedish orienteers
Male orienteers
Foot orienteers
World Orienteering Championships medalists
20th-century Swedish people